Sudhi Koppa is an Indian actor who appears in Malayalam films. He made his film debut in 2009 with an uncredited appearance in Sagar Alias Jacky Reloaded (2009).

Personal life
Sudhi hails from Kochi. His father, who was a government officer had a passion towards drama and owned a drama troupe. Sudhi also started off as a theatre artist at Vaikom Thirunal Theatre Group, before forming his own drama troupe called 'Creative Theatre Group'.

Career
Sudhi started off doing small roles in multi-starer movies. He played a goon attacking Bhavana in Sagar Alias Jacky Reloaded and one of the students in Seniors (2011). His theater background helped him secure a role in Lijo Jose Pellissery's Amen. He played the role of Solomon's friend Sebastian, who tries to woo Solomon's sister played by Rachana Narayanankutty. He then played many more small roles in Manglish and Sapthamashree Thaskaraha (2014).

His breakthrough came in Aadu (2015), in which he played "Kanjavu" Soman. The double-crossing Soman served as an important link between the different story tracks in the movie. He subsequently played an important role as the naive Unni in You Too Brutus (2015).

2016 saw a string of releases in which he had good roles. He played Darwin's henchman Appunni in Darvinte Parinamam (2015). He was then seen as Hari and Manu's friend Paul Achayan in Happy Wedding (2016). He then portrayed the alcoholic Thanka in Anuraga Karikkin Vellam (2016), who gets into fights with Abhi and friends. He also essayed the role of a comical thief, Kaimal aka Kai in Sajid Yahiya's directorial debut IDI: Inspector Dawood Ibrahim (2016). He was last seen as one of Asif Ali's teammates in Kavi Uddheshichathu..? (2016).

He is currently working on Third World Boys, a road movie and Theeram. He is also playing a major role in Avarude Raavukal (2017), starring Asif Ali (actor) and Unni Mukundan, and directed by Shanil Muhammed, who had earlier co-directed Philips and the Monkey Pen (2013).
He also acted in a small role alongside superstar Manju Warrier in Udaharanam Sujatha (2017), which brought him lot of praise and went on to be a critical and commercial success.

Filmography

References

External links 
 

Male actors in Malayalam cinema
Living people
Indian male film actors
21st-century Indian male actors
Male actors from Kochi
Year of birth missing (living people)